Between Two Women may refer to:

 Between Two Women (1937 film)
 Between Two Women (1945 film)
 Between Two Women (1986 film)
 Between Two Women (2000 film)